The 2023 FIFA Club World Cup will be the 20th edition of the FIFA Club World Cup, a FIFA-organised international club football tournament between the winners of the six continental confederations, as well as the host nation's league champions. The tournament will be played in Saudi Arabia from 12 to 22 December 2023. It will be the last seven-team Club World Cup before the tournament is expanded to 32 sides in 2025.

Real Madrid are the defending champions.

Host appointment
Although an expanded, quadrennial Club World Cup is planned for 2025, FIFA confirmed on 13 February 2023 that a 2023 tournament would be held using the previous seven-team format. Earlier that month, UOL Esporte reported that Saudi Arabia were interested in hosting the 2023 and 2024 Club World Cup tournaments. On 14 February, the FIFA Council confirmed Saudi Arabia as the host for the 2023 tournament.

Qualified teams

Notes

Matches

Notes

References

External links

2023
2023 in association football
2023
2023–24 in Saudi Arabian football
December 2023 sports events in Asia
Scheduled association football competitions